The Public and Commercial Services Union (PCS) is the sixth largest trade union in the United Kingdom. Most of its members work in UK government departments and other public bodies.

History 
The union was founded in 1998 by the merger of the Public Services, Tax and Commerce Union (which mostly represented the executive grades of the Civil Service) and the Civil and Public Services Association (mostly representing the clerical grades). The General Secretaries of the two unions, John Sheldon and Barry Reamsbottom respectively, became Joint General Secretaries of the new union. In 2000, Mark Serwotka was elected General Secretary and has held the position since: he was elected unopposed in 2005 (no other candidate received enough valid nominations from PCS branches); he was re-elected in 2009 for a five-year term, and in 2014 was re-elected for a further five years. In 2018, the union won £3 million in damages from the Department for Work and Pensions, after a legal challenge against the withdrawal of the "check off" system of paying union subscriptions.

Membership and organisation
The union had 195,901 members at the end of 2015 and is the largest trade union representing civil servants in the UK.

PCS is organised into groups that deal with different bargaining units such as Revenue and Customs, Work and Pensions and Law and Justice.

Two factions compete in elections to the National Executive Committee of the PCS, its governing body: the ruling Left Unity faction, which stands candidates as part of the Democracy Alliance, and an opposing Independent Left faction.

PCS Credit Union
PCS Credit Union Limited is a savings and loans co-operative established by the trade union for its members in 2011. It is a member of the Association of British Credit Unions Limited, authorised by the Prudential Regulation Authority and regulated by the Financial Conduct Authority and the PRA. Ultimately, like the banks and building societies, members’ savings are protected against business failure by the Financial Services Compensation Scheme.

Affiliations
Organisations to which PCS is affiliated include Abortion Rights, Amnesty international and the Cuba Solidarity Campaign.

Strikes and protests involving PCS members

2008 
In conjunction with Prospect, members at the Science Museum went on strike over pay.

2010

On 8 March 2010, 270,000 civil servants began a 48-hour strike over government changes to redundancy payments.

2011
The union voted for a one-day strike on 30 June 2011.

2013
Strike action was organised for New Year's Eve 2013 for all Metropolitan Police Service Civil Staff due to a pay dispute. Taking strike action on this day was deemed to be most effective because of the busy nature of the day for police.  The MPS offered a below inflation wage increase of 1%. Another strike ballot was announced on 6 February 2014 for strike action on 12 and 13 February 2014.

As part of the union's budget day strikes, a series of protests took place across branches in the Culture Group, including Tate and National Museums Liverpool to highlight the effect of government cuts to arts funding.

2014
PCS announced they would be joining a national strike alongside other unions on Budget Day - 10 July, over pay restraint and austerity in the public sector.

2015 
From 11 August 2015, PCS members at the National Gallery took indefinite strike action against a proposed privatisation of the security staff at the gallery. The strike lasted for over 100 days.

At the National Museum Wales branch, members voted for strike action after proposals to end their weekend pay premiums.

Members of the Royal Household branch, including staff at Windsor Castle, voted for action short of a strike in an effort to achieve the Living Wage.

Another of the union's Culture Group branches went on strike in December 2015 against the removal of weekend allowances. The dispute at the National Museum of Scotland branch was eventually ended when funding from the Scottish Government enabled a buy out of the allowances.

2016 
Cleaners in HMRC went on strike as their outsourced employer, ISS, claimed it couldn't afford the Government's new National Living Wage.

2017 
Strike action of Driving Examiners was organised for 4 and 5 December to coincide with the introduction of new driving tests in order to protest against the introduction of Satellite Navigation to the test on 4 December. Examiners also voted started work to rule on 23 November.

2019 
In conjunction with GMB, PCS members at Historic Royal Palaces took strike action against proposed changes to their pensions. This was the first time the Beefeaters had been on strike in 55 years.

Outsourced workers at the Department for Business, Energy and Industrial Strategy (BEIS) went on strike to demand the London Living Wage in a coordinated action with United Voices of the World (UVW) union members at the nearby Ministry of Justice.

In December 2019, Security Guards and Front of House workers at Wallace Collection successfully protested outside an exhibition opening to secure the London Living Wage.

2020 
Following mass redundancies in the arts and culture sector caused by the COVID-19 lockdown, PCS members working for the commercial arm of Tate galleries in London took 42 days strike action against mass redundancies. A further 300 redundancies were also announced at Southbank Centre, leading to mass protests by PCS members outside the venues.

2021 
After a large, and in several cases fatal, COVID-19 outbreak in the offices of the Drivers and Vehicle Licensing Agency (DVLA), PCS members took multiple days of strike action in June and July to highlight the lack of adequate health and safety protection.

Leadership

General Secretaries
1998: John Sheldon and Barry Reamsbottom
2000: Mark Serwotka

Assistant General Secretaries
2000: Hugh Lanning
2004: Chris Baugh and Hugh Lanning
2013: Chris Baugh
2019: John Moloney

See also 

 Lobbying in the United Kingdom
 British Civil Service
 Credit unions in the United Kingdom

References

External links
 PCS website
 PCS Young Members Website
 PCS Proud
 PCS family tree
 Catalogue of the PCS archives, held at the Modern Records Centre, University of Warwick
 Summary of the PCS Prison Service equal pay papers, held at the Modern Records Centre, University of Warwick

Trade unions in the United Kingdom
Civil service trade unions
1998 establishments in the United Kingdom
Trade unions established in 1998
Credit unions of the United Kingdom
London Borough of Wandsworth
Trade unions based in London
Trade unions affiliated with the Trades Union Congress